K25OB-D, virtual channel 27 (UHF digital channel 25), is a low-power, Class A NTD America-affiliated television station licensed to San Antonio, Texas, United States. The station is owned by HC2 Holdings.

History
On July 19, 1994, the FCC granted to Gonzalo A Santos a construction permit to build a low-power television station to serve the San Antonio, Texas area. The station was given the callsign K57GO, to operate on UHF channel 57. After two extensions of the construction permit, the latter resulting in the station's callsign being deleted, but later restored on approval, Santos sold the station to Three Angels Broadcasting Network (3ABN) in September 1996. Once the sale was approved by the FCC in April 1997, 3ABN immediately applied for a license for the station, which was granted on June 20, 1997.

In April 1997, the FCC released its list of full-service digital television allotments, and K57GO found itself between allotments for Fox affiliate KTBC-TV (channel 7) in Austin on UHF channel 56 and NBC affiliate KMOL-TV (channel 4; now WOAI-TV) in San Antonio on UHF channel 58, which increased the potential for interference on channel 57. In addition, the FCC wanted to move stations out of the 700 MHz band, which included stations on UHF channel 52 and above. K57GO applied to move to UHF channel 14 and also to upgrade its license to Class A in June 1998 and a permit was granted in March 2000. The station moved to channel 14 and changed its call letters to  K14LM on April 25, 2001.

The station was licensed for digital operation on May 28, 2015, moving operation to channel 27 and changing its call sign to the current K27LF-D.

3ABN sold K27LF-D and 13 other stations to HC2 Holdings for $9.6 million in 2017. On July 12, 2019, after the station's move to channel 25 was licensed, the call sign became K25OB-D.

Subchannels
The station's signal is multiplexed:

References

External links

Innovate Corp.
Television channels and stations established in 1997
Television stations in San Antonio
Low-power television stations in the United States